No Surrender is a 1985 British comedy film written by Alan Bleasdale, directed by Peter Smith and produced by Mamoun Hassan.

Describing the commissioning process, Bleasdale said, "I went to the National Film Finance Corporation and told them I was never going to write Star Wars or Rambo Revisited or anything like that, so I just went ahead and wrote the film I wanted to write".

Plot
On New Year's Eve in Liverpool, Michael becomes the new manager of the Charleston Club, a run-down function hall on an industrial wasteground which, he later discovers, is owned by an organised crime syndicate. He also discovers that the previous manager, MacArthur, in an attempt to spite the hall's owners, has hired it out to two groups of senior citizens for New Year's Eve; one group are hardline Catholics and the other are hardline Protestants, and the entertainment consists of a magician with stage fright, a gay comedian and his boyfriend, a talentless punk band, and a fancy dress competition with a non-existent prize.

The two parties arrive and are joined by another group of senior citizens who are mentally handicapped and suffering from senile dementia. After discovering MacArthur being tortured in a back room by the hall's owners, Michael, along with bouncer Bernard and kitchen porter Cheryl, attempts to keep things in order amid the threat of violence in the air. As the night goes on, however, things start to go wrong; the comedian's routine is badly received, the magician has to pull out because of the death of his rabbit, and the band's poor performance prompts the groups to throw missiles at the stage while the band members fight amongst themselves. Meanwhile, things begin to boil over when former Loyalist boxer Billy McCracken strangles on-the-run terrorist Norman Donohue to death in a toilet cubicle after Norman makes comments about McCracken's daughter "marrying out", and an Orange Order marching band arrives playing sectarian tunes, leading to a mass brawl in the toilets and the discovery of Norman's body. Meanwhile, Michael and Cheryl begin singing "If You Need Me" together on stage while Bernard phones the police, who arrive and defuse the situation.

The situation dies down by midnight, and the groups all go their separate ways peacefully. Michael and Cheryl share a kiss, before going back to Cheryl's house together. The film ends with McCracken phoning his daughter and asking to speak to his son-in-law, before wishing him a happy New Year.

Cast
 Michael Angelis as Mike
 Avis Bunnage as Martha Gorman
 James Ellis as Paddy Burke
 Tom Georgeson as Mr. Ross
 Bernard Hill as Bernard
 Ray McAnally as Billy McRacken
 Mark Mulholland as Norman
 Joanne Whalley as Cheryl
 J.G. Devlin as George Gorman
 Vince Earl as Frank
 Ken Jones as Ronny
 Michael Ripper as Tony Bonaparte
 Marjorie Sudell as Barbara
 Joan Turner as Superwoman
 Richard Alexander as Smoking Kid
 Pamela Austin as Organist
 Elvis Costello as Rosco de Ville
 Ian Hart as Uncertain Menace
 Joe McGann as Second Policeman
 Mark McGann as Rock Group Leader
 James Culshaw as O'Gormans Taxi Driver

Reception
Walter Goodman of The New York Times called it "a funny movie about a desperate condition."

Paul Attanasio of The Washington Post wrote:  "No Surrender"pretends to be a black comedy, but it really isn't -- it's just sour.

References

External links 
 
 
 

1985 films
1980s black comedy films
Films set in Liverpool
British black comedy films
Films about The Troubles (Northern Ireland)
1985 comedy films
Films shot in Greater Manchester
1980s English-language films
1980s British films